Two ships of the United States Navy have borne the name USS Permit, named in honor of the permit, a food fish, often called "round pompano", found in waters from North Carolina to Brazil.

 The first , was a Porpoise-class submarine, commissioned in 1937 and stricken in 1956.
Permit was commissioned in 1962 and stricken in 1991.

United States Navy ship names